Abingdon Foundation is a collective name for two independent schools based in and near Abingdon, Oxfordshire. It consists of Abingdon Preparatory School (formerly Josca's) and Abingdon School. Collectively they offer education from age 4 to 18.

Abingdon Preparatory School

The school is based in Frilford, Oxfordshire. It is a boys school that offers education for pupils from 4 to 13.  Until recently it was known as Josca's, but changed its name to integrate more with Abingdon School.

Abingdon School 

Abingdon School is based in Abingdon, Oxfordshire, and offers education from 11 to 18.

References

External links 
 Abingdon Preparatory School
 Abingdon School

Abingdon School